Joseph Bory Latour-Marliac (6 March 1830 in Granges-sur-Lot, Lot-et-Garonne - 26 January 1911, botanical author abbreviation: Lat.-Marl.) was a French lawyer and horticulturalist noted for breeding water lily hybrids. Latour-Marliac founded a water lily nursery at Le Temple-sur-Lot in 1875. A display of his plants at the Exposition Universelle of 1889 in Paris attracted the attention of the painter Claude Monet who then obtained water lilies for his garden in Giverny from Latour-Marliac.

References 

1830 births
1911 deaths
French gardeners